The transportation system in Mongolia consists of a network of railways, roads, waterways, and airports.

Railways

The Trans-Mongolian Railway connects the Trans-Siberian Railway from Ulan Ude (in Russia to Erenhot and Beijing in China through the capital Ulaanbaatar. The Mongolian section of this line runs for 1110 km. A spur line connects Darkhan to the copper mines of Erdenet; another spur line connects Ulaanbaatar with the coal mines of Baganuur.

A separate railway line is in the east of the country between Choibalsan and the Trans-Siberian at Borzya; however, that line is closed to passengers beyond the Mongolian town of Chuluunkhoroot. For domestic transport, daily trains run from Ulaanbaatar to Darkhan, Sukhbaatar, and Erdenet, as well as Zamyn-Üüd, Choir and Sainshand. The total length of the system 1,810 km. In 2007, rail transport carried 93% of Mongolian freight and 43% of passenger turnover (in tons*km and passenger*km, respectively).

Roadways
In 2007, only about 2600 km of Mongolia's road network were paved. Another 3900 km are graveled or otherwise improved. This network of paved roads was expanded to 4,800 km in 2013, with 1,800 km completed in 2014 alone. This included the roads from Ulaanbaatar to the Russian and Chinese borders, paved road from Ulaanbaatar to Kharkhorin and Bayankhongor, another going south to Mandalgovi, and a partly parallel road from Lün to Dashinchilen, as well as the road from Darkhan to Bulgan via Erdenet. The vast majority of Mongolia's official road network, some 40,000 km, are simple cross-country tracks.

Construction is underway on an east-west road (the so-called Millennium Road) that incorporates the road from Ulaanbaatar to Arvaikheer and on the extension of the Darkhan-Bulgan road beyond Bulgan. Private bus and minibus companies offer service from Ulaanbaatar to most aimag centers.

In September and December 2014 roads connecting Dalanzadgad town of Ömnögovi Province and Mörön town of Khuvsgul province with capital city of Ulaanbaatar were completed.

In 2019, the first expressway in Mongolia opened, the Ulaanbaatar Airport Expressway.

Bus
The history of public transport in Mongolia starts with the creation of <<Mongoltrans>> council in 1929. The first public bus route was between Ulaanbaatar city and then-city Amgalan with 5 rides a day.
Currently, buses are the main mode of public transportation in Ulaanbaatar. Buses pass stops at approximately 15-minute intervals. Buses runs between 7:00am and 10:00pm. As of 2020, there are about 900-950 buses operating daily in Ulaanbaatar city. In July 2013, Ulaanbaatar Urban Transport Service with Buyant-Ukhaa International Airport launched an express bus connecting the airport and downtown area. However, the service was stopped as of September 2013 for unknown period. There is transport between cities of Mongolia offering buses of all sizes from minivans to large coach buses (usually up to 45 seats). The national and municipal governments regulate a wide system of private transit providers which operate numerous bus lines around the city. There is also an Ulaanbaatar trolleybus system. Avtobus 1, Avtobus 3 (both are publicly owned), Tenuun Ogoo LLC, Erdem trans LLC and Sutain buyant LLC are major bus operators.

Taxi
There are about 10 licensed taxi companies such as Ulaanbaatar taxi (1991), Noyon taxi (1950), Telecom taxi (1109), 1616 taxi (1616)  and iTaxi with about 600 cars operating in Ulaanbaatar. There are a few local taxi companies in smaller cities such as Darkhan, Erdenet, Baganuur and Zuunmod. And there are many drivers with private unlicensed cars who act as taxis.

A typical fare is MNT 1,000 per kilometer; taxi drivers tend to ask for more especially if the client is a foreign national. However, many unofficial taxis use the mobile app platforms to take orders. Official taxis with proper markings are allowed to drive without plate number restrictions on the first lane of Ulaanbaatar's central road usually reserved for large public transports such as buses and trolleybuses from October 2013.

Waterways
Mongolia has 580 km of waterways, but only Lake Khövsgöl has ever been heavily used. The Selenge (270 km) and Orkhon (175 km) rivers are navigable but carry little traffic, although a customs boat patrols the Selenge to the Russian border. Lake Khovsgol has charter boats for tourists. The lakes and rivers freeze over in the winter and are usually open between May and September.

Air transportation

As of 2012, most airports of 21 aimag centers of Mongolia have paved runways. Those closest to Ulaanbaatar lack scheduled air service.

Buyant-Ukhaa International Airport outside of Ulaanbaatar is the major airport in Mongolia that offers international flights. Choibalsan's airport has international status and flights to the Chinese cities of Hailar, Erenhot and Manzhouli.

As of 2013, domestic air carriers such as MIAT Mongolian Airlines, Eznis Airways (unexpectedly suspended its operation on May 22, 2014) Aero Mongolia, Hunnu Air as well as international carriers such as Aeroflot, Korean Air, Air China and Turkish Airlines are offering scheduled services. Domestic airlines except MIAT Mongolian Airlines provide regular service between Ulaanbaatar and aimag centers. Domestic flights are operated using Fokker 50, Airbus A319 and Bombardier Q400 aircraft.

Ulaanbaatar can be accessed with regular flights from major cities such as Moscow, Berlin, Frankfurt, Beijing, Hong Kong, Singapore, Seoul, Tokyo, Osaka (served only in summer), Istanbul and Bishkek.

In 2013 the first purely air cargo operator was registered at the Civil Aviation Authority of Mongolia and is planned to commence operation in 2014.

Talks of a possible restart of flights between the Russian city of Ulan-Ude and Ulaanbaatar by a Russian airline have been reported.

References

External links 

Ministry of Road, Transportation, Construction and Urban Development
CIA World Factbook
Eznis Airways:Schedule & Charter airline of Mongolia
MIAT Mongolian Airlines - National Air Carrier